The United Congolese Party (UCP; Parti des Congolais Unis - PCU) is a Centre-right political party-in-exile representing domestic and diaspora interests in the Democratic Republic of the Congo. The party was established in January, 2010 by Kinshasan businessman Christian Malanga to serve as a platform for independent opposition candidates in the DRC.

The United Congolese Party was officially formed as the Congolese Liberation Movement (Mouvement de Libération Congolais) in January, 2010 by Kinshasan businessman and former military officer Christian Malanga. The purpose of the party was to provide organization for the loose assembly of independent opposition candidates in the Democratic Republic of the Congo's parliamentary elections in 2011.  When party candidates were detained prior to the widely contested elections and released weeks later, UCP president Christian Malanga moved the party apparatus to the Washington DC metropolitan area. There the party was reformed under a new charter in October 2012 as the United Congolese Party. The UCP currently campaigns and lobbies on behalf of both domestic and international Congolese interests in preparation for the next round of national elections in the Democratic Republic of the Congo.

Ambassador-at-Large Kanda Bongo Man
On April 7, 2014, Malanga appointed renowned Congolese soukous musician Kanda Bongo Man as the United Congolese Party's first Ambassador-at-Large in a ceremony in Washington DC. Kanda's chief duty as UCP Ambassador-at-Large is to cultivate good will and friendship with other progressive African leaders.

References

External links
 United Congolese Party Official Charter
 Party Facebook page

Political parties in the Democratic Republic of the Congo